Maurice van den Bemden (born 1898, date of death unknown) was a Belgian field hockey player and tennis player. He won a bronze medal at the 1920 Summer Olympics in Antwerp with the Belgium national field hockey team. He also competed in tennis at the 1920 Summer Olympics.

References

External links
 

1898 births
Year of death missing
Belgian male field hockey players
Belgian male tennis players
Field hockey players at the 1920 Summer Olympics
Olympic field hockey players of Belgium
Olympic medalists in field hockey
Olympic bronze medalists for Belgium
Olympic tennis players of Belgium
Tennis players at the 1920 Summer Olympics
Medalists at the 1920 Summer Olympics
20th-century Belgian people